This is a list of seasons completed by the Grand Rapids Rampage. The Rampage were a professional arena football franchise of the Arena Football League (AFL), based in Grand Rapids, Michigan. The team was established in 1998. The origins of the franchise date back to 1988, where they were the Detroit Drive, and then the Massachusetts Marauders for one season in 1994, but folded after that season. Three years later, Dan DeVos, son of Amway co-founder and current owner of the NBA's Orlando Magic, Richard DeVos, bought the franchise out of bankruptcy court, moved them to Grand Rapids, and renamed them the Rampage. The Rampage won ArenaBowl XV, and were regular playoff contenders from 1999 to 2003. After this however, the Rampage did not win more than five games until 2008. In the 2008 season, the Rampage were 6–10 and got to the conference championship, but fell short of a second ArenaBowl appearance. Prior to the 2009 season, the AFL announced that it had suspended operations indefinitely and canceled the 2009 season. The Rampage played their home games at Van Andel Arena.

References
General
 

Specific

Arena Football League seasons by team
Grand Rapids Rampage seasons
Michigan sports-related lists